Retrograde is a 2022 American documentary film directed by Matthew Heineman that covers events that took place during the final nine months of America's 20-year war in Afghanistan. It had its U.S. premiere at the Telluride Film Festival on September 3, 2022, and had its Canadian debut at the Vancouver International Film Festival on October 2, 2022. It was released in select theaters in the United States by National Geographic Documentary Films and was later made available on various streaming platforms. The film received critical acclaim, was nominated for the Directors Guild of America Award for Outstanding Directing in the Documentary Category at the Producers Guild of America Awards, and won the Doc NYC award at the annual documentary film festival.

Synopsis 
Retrograde is a 2022 American documentary film that covers events that took place during the final nine months of the United States' 20-year war in Afghanistan. The film includes actions taken by the last American Special Forces units stationed there, Sami Sadat, a young Afghan general and his troops defending their country, and a chaotic exodus of its civilians, desperate to flee a country that will once again be controlled by the Taliban.

Release 
Retrograde premiered in the United States on September 3, 2022, at the Telluride Film Festival. It had its Canadian premiere at the Vancouver International Film Festival on October 2, 2022.

Picturehouse released the film in select US cities on November 11 in New York City and Washington, D.C., and in Los Angeles, San Francisco, San Diego, and Colorado Springs on November 18.

The film began streaming in the US on National Geographic Channel on December 8, on Disney+ on December 9, and on Hulu on December 11.  It was released on Disney+ (Canada) on Friday January 13, 2023.

Reception

Critical response 
Retrograde was generally well received. Nicolas Rapold writes in The New York Times, "The Taliban takeover suggests a reply to the famous 1984 National Geographic cover — as if history is repeating itself with fresh suffering." In posting about the Green Beret working alongside the Afghans, Sheila O'Malley publishes for the film review site RogerEbert.com, "The intimacy between the men is one of the most striking things about Retrograde." In Variety, Peter Debruge declares that the film "brings back hi-def vérité footage that looks sharper and more artfully framed than most Hollywood features."

Accolades 
In addition to the accolades listed below, Retrograde was one of the 15 films shortlisted for the Academy Award for Best Documentary Feature Film, but was ultimately not selected as one of the five final nominees.

See also

References

Further reading

External links 
 
 
 Official trailer on YouTube

2020s American films
2022 documentary films
American documentary films
Documentary films about the War in Afghanistan (2001–2021)
Documentary films about war
National Geographic Society films
Films directed by Matthew Heineman